Blue Pond may refer to:

Blue Pond, Alabama, an unincorporated community in Cherokee County
Blue Pond (Biei), a pond in Biei, Hokkaido, Japan.